The 2009 KGHM Dialog Polish Indoors was a professional tennis tournament played on hard courts. It was part of the Tretorn SERIE+ of the 2009 ATP Challenger Tour. It was taking place in Wrocław, Poland between 2 and 8 February 2009.

Singles main-draw entrants

Seeds

 Rankings are as of January 19, 2009.

Other entrants
The following players received wildcards into the singles main draw:
  Marcin Gawron
  Jerzy Janowicz
  Michał Przysiężny
  Artur Romanowski

The following players received entry from the qualifying draw:
  Victor Ioniță
  Dawid Olejniczak
  Philipp Oswald
  Robin Vik
  Alexander Kudryavtsev (as a Lucky loser)

Champions

Men's singles

 Michael Berrer def.  Alexander Kudryavtsev, 6–3, 6–4

Men's doubles

 Sanchai Ratiwatana /  Sonchat Ratiwatana def.  Benedikt Dorsch /  Sam Warburg, 6–4, 3–6, [10–8]

KGHM Dialog Polish Indoors
KGHM Dialog Polish Indoors
2009